Silver Slipper Casino is a name that has been used by several casinos including:

 Silver Slipper Casino (Las Vegas)
 Silver Slipper Casino (Waveland)